Rhema University, Aba (RU) is an accredited private, Christian university based in the city of Aba in Abia State, Nigeria. Founded by the Living Word Ministries International and licensed by the National Universities Commission in 2009 is one of the few private universities in Abia State. The university is currently operating from its take-off campus located at 153/155 Aba-Owerri Road, Aba in Abia State, with plans to develop and migrate its students and faculty to the permanent campus.

The current vice-chancellor of the university is Professor O.C Onwudike, former vice chancellor of the Michael Okpara University of Agriculture and former chairman of the Special Committee on Private Universities at the National Universities Commission. In September 2014, the university graduated its first set of students, and in January 2015 it signed an Equity Investment Agreement with BAU Research and Development and joined its Network of Institutions.

History
The history of the Rhema University can be traced back to 1987, when the president of the Living Word Ministries – Emmanuel Okorie, concerned by the falling standard of education in Nigeria, decided to address these problems with the setting up of nursery, primary and secondary schools in some states of Nigeria and Lome, Togo. This was part of the evangelistic outreach of the ministry. Given the statistics which show that the few places available for University admission are greatly oversubscribed in Nigeria, Living Word Ministries ventured into the area of tertiary education to provide Christian education in that academic level.

In 2004 the Living Word Ministries constituted a planning and Implementation Committee towards the realization of the project. In 2009 the university received its license to operate as a private university in Nigeria, and admitted its first cohort of students.

Academic programmes

Rhema University, Aba offers 10 undergraduate programmes in two colleges and Post Graduate Programmes too. The university also offers pre-degree programmes through its School of Basic Studies. Currently, the colleges at Rhema University are:

Facilities
Rhema University has set up facilities to aid learning and learning for both students and faculty members as well to provide services for those living in the university campus. The facilities at Rhema University include:

Research laboratories
The university maintains laboratories for student, independent and specialist research purposes. All university students are required to take basic courses in their first year of learning and as such, the university maintains Biological Sciences, Chemical Sciences, Physical Sciences and Computer Sciences Laboratories.

University library
The university library houses multimedia learning and research resources including articles, textbooks, journals and published papers that are available in hard and soft copies. The university also has a virtual library service that collates resources from publishers and provides access to Rhema University students and faculty within the university computer network. The web based eLibrary is accessible by students and faculty at all times.

The university farm

As part of its effort to foster learning, entrepreneurship and research in the agricultural field, Rhema University set up a farm focusing on crops, livestock and a poultry. The university farm is also part of the University Ventures, producing processed food for the consumption of students and the general public.

Rhema University Hospital
The university currently houses an emergency unit, a surgery unit, a specialist eye clinic and more, catering for Rhema University students and the general public. The university is currently equipping the Living Word Mission Hospital with dialysis units towards its determination to transform the hospital into a Teaching Hospital as the university plans to open programs in Medical Sciences.

University radio station
As part of the Rhema University Mass Communication Department and the university's media and communications efforts, the university owns a fully licensed to operate radio station covering FM range, broadcast from within the Rhema University campus in Aba. The university radio broadcasts programs from the university and the Living Word Ministries Intl.

Campus

Location
The university is currently operating from its take-off campus situated at #153/155 Aba-Owerri Road in the heart of business city of Aba in Abia State. This is a city campus that is in close proximity to city centre and the major factories in the city. The establishment of the campus has led to significant development in its vicinity. Apart from the acquisition of over 100 hectares of land for the university's permanent campus development, the Living Word Ministries in preparation for the eventual setting up of the university set up a hospital complex which is well equipped and which is also one of the very few hospitals in the Eastern states of Nigeria with a functional dialysis unit.

Sports and athletics

Rhema University has varsity athletic teams. Students are encouraged to engage in one or more sporting activity during their time at the university. Sports and Athletic activities with provided facilities include
Football
Basketball
Track and field

Student life
As a Christian university, morality is high importance in the student life on campus. Rhema University students are encouraged to adhere to the Student Policies and Regulations. All students are required to live on campus through the duration of their studies. In addition to learning facilities, the university provides services and facilities to support life on campus:
Student Groups
Dining and Restaurant
Shopping
Accommodation / Hostels
Medical Services
Social Responsibility Programs

Governance and administration
Rhema University was founded by the Living Word Ministries International. Its founder, Emmanuel Okorie, serves as the chancellor of the university. The university administration is led by its 
Vice chancellor – Professor O.C Onwudike
The acting registrar – Mr. Chikezie U. Iheaka 
The university librarian – Dr. Wisdom O. Anyim
The bursar – Mr Ezenwa, Emmanuel O

References

Educational institutions established in 2009
Christian universities and colleges in Nigeria
2009 establishments in Nigeria
Education in Abia State